Liberty Fanfare is a composition for orchestra by John Williams. Written in 1986, the piece was commissioned to celebrate the Centennial of the Statue of Liberty on July 4 that year. However, it was actually premiered a month beforehand, on June 4, when Williams conducted the Boston Pops. The entire piece is approximately five minutes in length and uses both the brass section for the main themes and the strings for providing a recurring, melodious motif. The rhythm is also repeated several times throughout the piece.

Before the premiere of the piece, Williams commented that he had "tried to create a group of American airs and tunes of my own invention that I hope will give some sense of the event and the occasion". The composition received generally positive reviews at the time and is still regularly performed as a patriotic piece. Several recordings of the piece are also available.

Partial discography
1987: By Request...The Best of John Williams & the Boston Pops Orchestra, John Williams and the Boston Pops Orchestra - Philips Records
1988: American Jubilee, Erich Kunzel and the Cincinnati Pops Orchestra - Telarc Records
1990: The Best of John Williams, the Philharmonic Rock Orchestra - Naxos Records
1998: Victory at Sea (arranged for concert band), the United States Navy Band - Altissimo! Records
1999: Splash of Pops, Keith Lockhart and the Boston Pops Orchestra - RCA Records

See also
 List of compositions by John Williams

References

External links
Liberty Fanfare - The John Williams web pages. Retrieved June 4, 2006.
Unofficial Liberty Fanfare website, Allison Schwartz. Retrieved June 4, 2006.

1986 compositions
Compositions by John Williams
Compositions for symphony orchestra
Compositions in D major
Statue of Liberty